Anatoly Petrovich Khokhlov (29 October 1947 – March 2008) was a Soviet boxer. He competed in the men's welterweight event at the 1972 Summer Olympics.

References

External links
 
 

1947 births
2008 deaths
Soviet male boxers
Olympic boxers of the Soviet Union
Boxers at the 1972 Summer Olympics
Place of birth missing
Welterweight boxers